Sean Campion (born 20 December 1959) is an Irish actor known for his portrayal as Virginio Orsini in the historical drama television series Borgia. In theatre, he is best known for his portrayal as Jake Quinn in Marie Jones's Stones in His Pockets which he was nominated for a Laurence Olivier Award for Best Actor and for which he received a Drama Desk Special Award. His notable feature film appearances are Goldfish Memory and Hallmark Hall of Fame's The Blackwater Lightship.

Career

Television and film career
Campion first started his career in 1985, in the television film Cúirt an Mheán Oíche which is based on Siobhan McKenna's dramatic adaptation of Brian Merriman's 18th century poem. In 1988, he starred in the RTÉ One/Channel 4 four-part television miniseries period drama, Echoes, based on the novel of the same name by Maeve Binchy.

In 2003, Campion starred in Goldfish Memory, about a small group of characters experiencing relationships which build and crumble before the viewers eyes. The following year in 2004, Campion appeared in the Hallmark Hall of Fame TV movie adaptation of Colm Tóibín's novel The Blackwater Lightship, alongside Angela Lansbury, Dianne Wiest and Gina McKee. It aired on CBS on 4 February 2004.

In 2005, Campion guest-starred as Mike in the BBC One soap opera EastEnders. He also guest-starred as Cliff Healy in the BBC One medical drama television series Holby City.

In 2011, Campion has a recurring role as Virginio Orsini in the historical drama television series Borgia, which recounts the Borgia family's rise to power and subsequent domination of the Papal States during the Renaissance.

In 2014, Campion starred in the French film United Passions, about the origins of the world governing body of association football, Fédération Internationale de Football Association (FIFA).

Theatre career

In 2009, Campion played Benedick in Timothy Sheader's production of William Shakespeare's Much Ado About Nothing at the Regent's Park Open Air Theatre, alongside Samantha Spiro, who played Beatrice.

Campion played the role of the mother in Selma Dimitrijevic's production of her play titled Gods Are Fallen and All Safety Gone, alongside Scott Turnbull who played the role of the daughter, and presented by Grayscale. The play revolves on what happens when people discover that parents are flawed human beings as people are, through the interactions of a mother (portrayed by Campion) and a daughter (portrayed by Turnbull). In 2015 and 2016-2017 he also appeared in the premiere of All the Angels, a biographical play on the Dublin premiere of Handel's Messiah.

Filmography

References

External links

1959 births
Living people
Irish male film actors
Irish male television actors
20th-century Irish male actors
21st-century Irish male actors
Actors from County Kilkenny